Waiuatua may refer to:

Euphorbia glauca, a New Zealand native coastal plant
Rhabdothamnus solandri, a New Zealand native forest shrub